The Merry-go-round of death is an internet challenge involving multiple participants, a roundabout (or merry-go-round) and a method of motorisation, usually a moped or motorcycle. At least one of the participants rides on the merry-go-round, while the motorcycle or moped's rear wheel is placed against the disc of the ride, and then used to spin the merry-go-round. The goal is to hold on to the roundabout for as long as possible, though the effects of strong centrifugal force and increased g-force means that holding on is almost impossible, and participants may fall unconscious; numerous people have been severely injured as a result of injuries sustained from the challenge, which include those caused by high G-forces that have been described as 'normally only seen in fighter pilots', as well as blunt-force trauma inflicted as a result of colliding with nearby objects while being spun, or being launched from the roundabout into nearby objects. The challenge can be dated to before 2009, when an early video of the challenge involving two teenagers being launched by a roundabout went viral; it received heightened attention in 2018 when a schoolboy from Tuxford, Nottinghamshire, England was subjected to the challenge as a form of school bullying. As a result of being forced to take part in the challenge, the boy sustained serious head trauma that resulted in unconsciousness, his eyes bulging from their sockets, and a potential risk of stroke due to the extreme pressure exerted on his body during the spinning.

References

Challenges
Viral videos